Matthew Dylan Kenyon (born 8 February 1998) is an Australian professional basketball player for the USC Rip City of the NBL1 North. He debuted in the National Basketball League (NBL) in 2016 and played two seasons for the Brisbane Bullets before playing a season in the NBA G League. He returned to the NBL in 2021 with the Tasmania JackJumpers.

Early life and career
Kenyon was born in Avoca Beach, New South Wales. He played for the Gosford City Rebels as a junior and represented New South Wales multiple times. He attended Hunter Sports High School in Newcastle, New South Wales.

In 2016, Kenyon moved to Canberra to attend the BA Centre of Excellence, where he played for the program's SEABL team. In 16 games, he averaged 10.8 points, 3.9 rebounds, 2.4 assists and 1.8 steals per game.

Professional career
For the 2016–17 NBL season, Kenyon joined the Brisbane Bullets. He played 17 games in his first season.

For the 2017 QBL season, Kenyon joined the Sunshine Coast Phoenix. He averaged 12.2 points per game and was named the QBL's U23 Player of the Year.

Kenyon returned to the Bullets for the 2017–18 NBL season but was limited to four games. He suffered a dislocated knee towards the end of the season which saw him miss 12 months. He returned to action during the 2019 NBL1 season with the Dandenong Rangers, averaging 11.3 points in 17 games.

For the 2019–20 season, Kenyon moved to the United States, where he completed workouts with the Los Angeles Lakers, Los Angeles Clippers and Chicago Bulls. On 27 October 2019, Kenyon was drafted by the Capital City Go-Go with the 19th overall pick in the NBA G League Draft and was included in the team's training camp roster. He was waived by the Capital City Go-Go on 22 January 2020, and was subsequently picked up by the South Bay Lakers on 7 February 2020. In 18 games across the two teams, he averaged 1.3 points and 1.9 rebounds per game.

Kenyon returned to Australia and played for the Central Coast Crusaders during the 2020 Waratah League season. In 2021, he played for the Ballarat Miners in the NBL1 South.

For the 2021–22 NBL season, Kenyon joined the inaugural roster of the Tasmania JackJumpers. Following the NBL season, he played for the North-West Tasmania Thunder in the 2022 NBL1 South season.

Kenyon re-joined the JackJumpers for the 2022–23 NBL season. He was ruled out for four-to-six weeks in mid November with a calf injury.

On 2 March 2023, Kenyon signed with the USC Rip City of the NBL1 North.

National team career
In June 2017, Kenyon was selected in the Australian Emerging Boomers squad for the Summer Universiade in Taipei.

In February 2021, Kenyon was selected to play for Australia in the 2021 FIBA Asia Cup qualification against New Zealand. Australia won the game 81–52 and Kenyon helped contribute with 6 points, 10 rebounds and 2 assists.

References

External links
NBL profile
Brisbane Bullets profile
"Kenyon's Journey to Becoming the Perfect JackJumper" at nbl.com.au

1998 births
Living people
Australian expatriate basketball people in the United States
Australian men's basketball players
Brisbane Bullets players
Capital City Go-Go players
Shooting guards
South Bay Lakers players
Sportsmen from New South Wales
Tasmania JackJumpers players